Jia Junpeng was an internet meme and catchphrase that became popular on the Internet in China in 2009.

Origins 
A post in Chinese titled "Jia Junpeng, your mother is calling you home for dinner" (贾君鹏你妈妈喊你回家吃饭) appeared on the Chinese portal Baidu in the forum for the game World of Warcraft at 10:59 a.m on 16 July 2009. The body of the thread content consisted of only 2 letters, namely RT, an abbreviation that simply means "as the title (suggests)". The poster used the IP address of "222.94.255.***"; his identity and motivation are unknown. Soon, a post authored by 'Jia Junpeng', replied, "I'm not going home for dinner, I'm having dinner at the Internet café. Please tell my mom that." Users later found that this user had registered only three minutes after the initial post.

After six hours, it attracted more than 17,000 replies from 400,000 viewers, most of whom were young people. Some forum users who joined in with replies had changed their user names to "Jia Junpeng's dad", "Jia Junpeng's grandpa", "Jia Junpeng's sister", "Jia Junpeng's dog", etc. forming a huge Jia family. Follow-up posts grew exponentially, and became more and more ridiculous and meaningless. Users doctored photos, started cyberhunts, and the rate of replies reached several thousand per second. The page registered in excess of 243,000 replies and 6 million hits by 9 pm the next day. The thread stopped when it became saturated at 1:38 pm on 20 July – the 315,649 comments received translated into 10,421 pages. The Los Angeles Times declared in September that "the catchphrase has gone viral in recent weeks."

Interpretation, reception and after-effects 
According to China Hush website, World of Warcraft had been inaccessible with the host, NetEase, claiming it was suffering outages due to a competitor's attack. Five million Chinese WoW players were frustrated and impatient, so "Jia Junpeng, your mom tells you to go home to eat" has been interpreted by WoW players as "Netease hurry up and start the World of Warcraft service".

Some people attribute the popularity of the meme to the childhood memories it arouses. However, some are also of the opinion that such a deep analysis is unwarranted, since they consider the "Jia Junpeng Phenomenon" to be merely kuso culture from internet. A China Daily editorial called it "a demonstration of collective boredom."

According to one analyst, the newly popular internet phenomenon reflects some characteristics of popular culture such as anti-intellectualism, an unwillingness to care about something's original value, confusion, a willingness to follow the crowd, decadence, and immaturity. Hu Jiqing, associate professor from the College of Journalism and Communications at Nanjing University, said the unprecedented popularity of the post may be easily explained because the common saying "Your mother is calling you home for dinner," resonates – as young people addicted to Internet games often feel guilty about their families – and causes people to reflect.

The meme has sparked various Photoshop contests throughout internet forums, where the catchphrase is often photoshopped into various places, such as banners, signs in public places, or as a caption to a humorous image. Jia Junpeng's popularity is indicated by its use on T-shirts, blogs and in song. The expression has also been used by human rights activists to demand the release of a jailed legal scholar. Businesses have also sought to capitalise by using the meme: car dealer in Sichuan created a banner that read: "Jia Junpeng, your mom is calling you to drive home a Roewe 550." One restaurant sign was spotted with the slogan: "Jia Junpeng, your mom is calling you to eat Yanjing Hotpot!"

See also 
List of internet phenomena
Internet in the People's Republic of China
Very erotic very violent
Baidu 10 Mythical Creatures

References

External links 
贾君鹏你妈妈喊你回家吃饭 Actual Baidu thread
Jia Junpeng: A Common Boy Known by the Entire China Internet in 6 Hours
"贾吃饭"暴红网络 无厘头"水帖"成网民狂欢时刻
贾君鹏回家吃饭出现国际版
网易关服网民无限寂寞 "吃饭"水贴充当引爆火线
百度发帖百万人回 "你妈妈喊你回家吃饭"成流行语
"贾君鹏"蹿红网络背后：网民们自称很寂寞
"妈妈喊你回家吃饭"背后的孤寂

Internet memes introduced in 2009
Chinese Internet slang
Baidu Tieba